The 2015 Indoor Football League season was the seventh season of the Indoor Football League. Playing with ten teams in two conferences located in mid-sized cities predominantly in the central United States, the league's regular season kicked off on February 28, 2015, when the reigning league champion Sioux Falls Storm travelled to the Bemidji Axemen. The regular season ended 16 weeks later on June 20, 2015, with the Green Bay Blizzard visiting the Iowa Barnstormers. The playoffs were held in two rounds with the top two teams in each conference facing off in a conference championship game followed by the winners of those games meeting in the United Bowl.

Teams
For 2015, the IFL maintained its two-conference no-divisions format with each of 10 teams played 14 games during the 16-week regular season. This is the one more teams than the number of teams as played in the 2014 IFL season. The Texas-based Wichita Falls Nighthawks expansion team replaced the Texas Revolution which left for Champions Indoor Football for the 2015 season. The Iowa Barnstormers joined the IFL from the Arena Football League after making a move due to easier regional travel. The Wyoming Cavalry folded, and the league accepted the expansion franchise of Billings Wolves and the Wichita Falls Nighthawks.

United Conference

Intense Conference

Expansion
In January 2014, the league announced that the Billings Wolves would join the league for the 2015 season. The Wolves played their home games at Rimrock Auto Arena at MetraPark in Billings, Montana. The city was previously home to the Billings Outlaws, who folded after a tornado heavily damaged the arena leaving them with heavy, uninsured losses.

On August 25, 2014, the Nighthawks became official members of the Indoor Football League.

Standings

Playoffs

Awards

Individual season awards

1st Team All-IFL

2nd Team All-IFL

References